Internatsionalnoye is a village in southern Kazakhstan. It is located in the Merki District in Jambyl Region. Population:

References

Populated places in Jambyl Region